The Morrígan is a figure from Irish mythology. 

Morrigan may also refer to:

Fictional characters
 Morrigan Aensland, in the Darkstalkers video game series
 Morrigan (Dragon Age), in the Dragon Age video game series
 Morrigan (Stargate), in the Stargate SG-1 series
 Morrigan, in the Southern Knights comic book

Other uses
 Morrigan (band), an American traditional music group
 Morrigan (drag queen), Thai drag queen

See also